The Berlin Street Railway was an electric interurban railway in the city of Berlin, New Hampshire, in the United States. It operated from 1902 to 1938.

References

Rail transportation in New Hampshire